Benon is a commune in the Charente-Maritime department in the Nouvelle-Aquitaine region in southwestern France.

Population

Its population, unlike other parts of the department, slowly grew, but saw a small decline between the late 1960s and the 1980s.

See also
 Communes of the Charente-Maritime department

References

External links
 

Communes of Charente-Maritime
Arrondissement of La Rochelle
Charente-Maritime communes articles needing translation from French Wikipedia